The Sanate Sugar Mill is located near the Sanate Abajo River in the La Altagracia Province of the Dominican Republic.

World Heritage Status 
This site was added to the UNESCO World Heritage Tentative List on May 5, 2002 in the Cultural category.

Notes

References 
Sanate Sugar Mill [Ruta de Los Ingenios] - UNESCO World Heritage Centre Retrieved 2009-03-03.

Dominican Republic culture